Vernon Sprague "Whitey" Wilshere (August 3, 1912 – May 23, 1985) was a professional baseball pitcher. He played three seasons in Major League Baseball from 1934 to 1936 with the Philadelphia Athletics. He batted and threw left-handed.

External links

Major League Baseball pitchers
Philadelphia Athletics players
St. Paul Saints (AA) players
Wilkes-Barre Barons (baseball) players
Baseball players from New York (state)
1912 births
1985 deaths